Leonard Anthony Tawiah (born 26 March 1993) is a Ghanaian footballer who played as a midfielder for Equatorial Guinean club Futuro Kings FC.

References

1993 births
Living people
Ghanaian footballers
Association football midfielders
Ghana Premier League players
Accra Hearts of Oak S.C. players
Futuro Kings FC players
Ghanaian expatriate footballers
Ghanaian expatriate sportspeople in Equatorial Guinea
Expatriate footballers in Equatorial Guinea